The 2007 Women's Six Nations Championship, also known as the 2007 RBS Women's 6 Nations due to the tournament's sponsorship by the Royal Bank of Scotland, was the sixth series of the rugby union Women's Six Nations Championship and was won by , who achieved their second successive Grand Slam. Italy took part in the Six Nations for the first time, replacing Spain.

Final table

Results

Leading points scorers

See also
Women's Six Nations Championship
Women's international rugby

References

External links
The official RBS Six Nations Site

2007
2007 rugby union tournaments for national teams
2006–07 in Irish rugby union
2006–07 in English rugby union
2006–07 in Welsh rugby union
2006–07 in Scottish rugby union
2006–07 in French rugby union
2006–07 in Italian rugby union
2006–07 in European women's rugby union
rugby union
rugby union
rugby union
rugby union
Women
rugby union
rugby union
Women's Six Nations
Women's Six Nations